Baviola is a genus of Seychelloise jumping spiders that was first described by Eugène Louis Simon in 1898.  it contains only three species, found only on the Seychelles: B. braueri, B. luteosignata, and B. vanmoli.

References

Salticidae genera
Endemic fauna of Seychelles
Salticidae
Spiders of Africa